The campus of Chungbuk Provincial University of Science and Technology lies in Okcheon County, North Chungcheong province, South Korea.  It employs about 25 professors, providing instruction in a variety of technical fields.  The current president is Jin-Young, Lee.

Academics
All course offerings are at the undergraduate level, and are made through the school's nine departments:  Biotechnology, E-Commerce, Foods & Life Science, Electronics & Information, Computer Information, Visual Communication Design, Environmental Engineering, Energy Systems, and Precision Mechanical Engineering.

History
Discussions between the Ministry of Education and the provincial government about establishing the school were an election promise made in the country's elections of 1992, which brought Kim Young-sam to power.  These discussions actually began in late 1994, and official permission to establish the college was granted in 1996; construction on the campus began early the following year.  The school opened its doors in 1998.

See also
List of national universities in South Korea
List of universities and colleges in South Korea
Education in Korea

External links
Official school website 
Official school website 

Universities and colleges in North Chungcheong Province
Okcheon County
1998 establishments in South Korea
Educational institutions established in 1998
Public universities and colleges in South Korea